Rajya Sabha elections were held on various dates in 1983, to elect members of the Rajya Sabha, Indian Parliament's upper chamber.

Elections
Elections were held to elect members from various states.

Members elected
The following members are elected in the elections held in 1983. They are members for the term 1983-1989 and retire in year 1989, except in case of the resignation or death before the term.
The list is incomplete.

State - Member - Party

Bye-elections
The following bye elections were held in the year 1983.

State - Member - Party

 Haryana - Chand Ram - INC ( ele  12/03/1983 term till 1984 )
 Gujarat - Irshad Baig Mirza  - INC ( ele  21/03/1983 term till 1984 )
 Bihar - Chandan K Bagchi - INC ( ele  12/04/1983 term till 1984 )
 Uttar Pradesh -- V P Singh -- JD ( ele  23/07/1983 term till 1988 )
 Karnataka -- Sarojini Mahishi -- JAN ( ele  08/09/1983 term till 1984 )

References

1983 elections in India
1983